Vexillum yulini is a species of sea snail, a marine gastropod mollusk, in the family Costellariidae, the ribbed miters.

Distribution
This species occurs in the following locations:
 East China Sea
 Philippines

References

yulini
Gastropods described in 2017